Édouard Ramonet (14 June 1909, Cerbère - 4 August 1980) was a French politician. He represented the Radical Party in the Constituent Assembly elected in 1945, in the Constituent Assembly elected in 1946 and in the National Assembly from 1946 to 1958. He was Minister of Commerce and Industry from 1958 to 1959.

References

1909 births
1980 deaths
People from Pyrénées-Orientales
Politicians from Occitania (administrative region)
Radical Party (France) politicians
French Ministers of Commerce and Industry
Members of the Constituent Assembly of France (1945)
Members of the Constituent Assembly of France (1946)
Deputies of the 1st National Assembly of the French Fourth Republic
Deputies of the 2nd National Assembly of the French Fourth Republic
Deputies of the 3rd National Assembly of the French Fourth Republic
French people of the Algerian War